David Jamaal White (born September 9, 1993) is an American football cornerback who is a free agent. He played college football at Georgia Tech, and was drafted by the Kansas City Chiefs in sixth round of the 2016 NFL Draft.

Early years
White was born in Atlanta, Georgia, to Brockston and Zina White. He began to play football in the 6th grade. He attended Union Grove High School and played for Head Coach Paul Borgdorf. In High school he played cornerback and wide receiver where he made the All-Region team and was an honorable mention for All-State. He wore number 9 on his jersey in school because it represented his birth month and day.

White was considered a three star prospect by Rivals.com, the 34th best in the country at his position. He received a number of offers to play division one football including those from Georgia Tech, Auburn, California, and Illinois. He ultimately committed to Georgia Tech following his visit to the school on December 9, 2012.

College career
White chose to major in business administration, and after not receiving a redshirt designation by the Yellow Jackets, played in the last 10 games of the season and forced a fumble in conference play against North Carolina. He followed up his efforts in his sophomore year by playing in every game that season, and starting at defensive back for nine of them. During the Music City Bowl against Ole Miss, White recorded the first interception of his college career in the fourth quarter.

He continued to improve in his junior year as he started every game of the season. During the game against the Virginia Tech Hokies, he recorded his second interception and set up what was ultimately the game-winning drive. A week later, he stopped a 75-yard run by forcing a fumble out of the back of the end zone against the Pittsburgh Panthers that went for a touchback. On November 8, 2014, White had his first career touchdown against North Carolina State when he intercepted a pass by Jacoby Brissett by stepping in front of his wide receiver and running it back 48 yards for the touchdown.  He finished the season with four interceptions, leading the team. In addition he also led the team in pass break-ups with eight, and also registered one forced fumble. His efforts resulted in him being named an All-ACC honorable mention by the media.

In his final year with the Yellow Jackets, White started 11 games. He started out the season recording five tackles and five pass break-ups against Virginia Tech. He went on to force a fumble against North Carolina a month later.  He finished the year leading the team in pass-breakups, and two interceptions.

Professional career
White's play in college earned him an invitation to the NFL Scouting Combine. Lance Zierlein of NFL.com praised him for his patience in coverage and his ability to displace receivers with his jam technique. He also complimented his ability to break on the ball with his short quickness, and noted that he had forced at least one fumble every year he was at Georgia Tech. But Zierlein criticized his "very" average recovery speed and his inability to efficiently exercise proper technique in coverage, specifically the fact that he could not turn around fast enough or "flip his hips" quickly. He projected White to be a third round pick.

Kansas City Chiefs
White was drafted by the Kansas City Chiefs in the sixth round, 178th overall, of the 2016 NFL Draft.

On November 4, 2017, White was waived by the Chiefs.

Indianapolis Colts
Two days after the Chiefs waived him, White was claimed off waivers by the Indianapolis Colts.

On September 1, 2018, White was waived by the Colts and was signed to the practice squad the next day, only to be released two days later.

Washington Redskins
White signed with the Washington Redskins on August 2, 2019. He was waived on August 31, 2019.

Philadelphia Eagles
White was signed to the Philadelphia Eagles' practice squad on September 30, 2019.

Atlanta Falcons
On October 8, 2019, White was signed by the Atlanta Falcons off the Eagles practice squad. He was waived on October 28.

Dallas Cowboys
On October 31, 2019, White was signed to the Dallas Cowboys practice squad. On December 30, 2019, White was signed to a reserve/future contract. On April 30, 2020, he was waived by the Cowboys.

Atlanta Falcons (second stint)
On September 23, 2020, White was signed to the Atlanta Falcons practice squad. He was released on September 29, 2020.

Las Vegas Raiders
On October 13, 2020, White was signed to the Las Vegas Raiders' practice squad. He was placed on the practice squad/injured list on October 27. He was released with an injury settlement on October 29.

References

1993 births
Living people
Players of American football from Atlanta
American football cornerbacks
Georgia Tech Yellow Jackets football players
Kansas City Chiefs players
Indianapolis Colts players
Washington Redskins players
Philadelphia Eagles players
Atlanta Falcons players
Dallas Cowboys players
Las Vegas Raiders players